Montenegro competed at the 2014 Summer Youth Olympics, in Nanjing, China from 16 August to 28 August 2014.

Medalists
Medals awarded to participants of mixed-NOC (Combined) teams are represented in italics. These medals are not counted towards the individual NOC medal tally.

Athletics

Montenegro qualified one athlete.

Qualification Legend: Q=Final A (medal); qB=Final B (non-medal); qC=Final C (non-medal); qD=Final D (non-medal); qE=Final E (non-medal)

Girls
Field events

Judo

Montenegro qualified two athletes based on its performance at the 2013 Cadet World Judo Championships.

Individual

Team

Taekwondo

Montenegro was given a wild card to compete.

Boys

Tennis

Montenegro was given a quota to compete by the tripartite committee.

Singles

Doubles

References

2014 in Montenegrin sport
Nations at the 2014 Summer Youth Olympics
Montenegro at the Youth Olympics